El Macho (also known as Macho Killers) is a 1977 Italian-Argentine Spaghetti Western film written and directed by Marcello Andrei and starring Carlos Monzón, George Hilton, Malisa Longo and Susana Giménez.

Synopsis   
Kid El Macho, an adventurer who is very skilled with cards and his revolver, is instructed by a sheriff to recover a large sum of money, which was stolen after an attack on a stagecoach by the outlaw Hidalgo, a.k.a. "the Duke", and his gang. The Kid starts posing as The Vulture, another outlaw who is actually dead, but with whom Kid bears a strong resemblance, and seeks to infiltrate Hidalgo's gang under his assumed identity. El Macho succeeds in his enterprise by unmasking an unsuspecting banker who was the mastermind responsible for the robbery. The Kid hopes to share the bounty with his lover, the beautiful Kelly, but his adventures are not over yet.

Cast
 Carlos Monzón as El Macho/Kid El Macho/The Kid/The Vulture
 George Hilton as Hidalgo, the Duke
 Malisa Longo as Helen/Kelly
 Susana Giménez as Susana/Soledad
 Giuseppe Castellano as Ross
 Benito Stefanelli as Sheriff
 Bruno Di Luia as Gunner
 Vittorio Fanfoni as Angel

See also     
 List of Italian films of 1977
 List of Argentine films of 1977

References

External links
 

1977 films
1970s Spanish-language films
Films directed by Marcello Andrei
Spaghetti Western films
1977 Western (genre) films
Argentine Western (genre) films
1970s Argentine films
1970s Italian films